Edward Kelly (6 October 1883 – 23 April 1972) was an Irish Fianna Fáil politician. A merchant and farmer, he was elected to Dáil Éireann as a Fianna Fáil Teachta Dála (TD) for the Monaghan constituency at the 1954 general election. He lost his seat at the 1957 general election.

References

1883 births
1972 deaths
Fianna Fáil TDs
Members of the 15th Dáil
Politicians from County Monaghan
Irish farmers